Robert Změlík (born April 18, 1969 in Prostějov) is a Czech track and field athlete who won a gold medal in Olympic decathlon in 1992.

His personal best in decathlon was 8627 points (1992), in Heptathlon 6228 points (1997), both former national records. Změlík's Olympic success was influential for two other Czech decathletes and world record holders, Tomáš Dvořák and Roman Šebrle.

He was a frequent competitor at the Hypo-Meeting in Götzis, Austria, participating in 1989, 1991, 1992, 1993 and 1995. He made the podium for the first time in the 1991 Hypo-Meeting, taking second place with a score of 8346 points, then had his first win at the 1992 Hypo-Meeting, where he set a career-best score.

International competitions

External links

1969 births
Living people
Sportspeople from Prostějov
Czech decathletes
Czechoslovak decathletes
Czech male hurdlers
Olympic athletes of Czechoslovakia
Olympic gold medalists for Czechoslovakia
Athletes (track and field) at the 1992 Summer Olympics
Olympic athletes of the Czech Republic
Athletes (track and field) at the 1996 Summer Olympics
World Athletics Championships athletes for Czechoslovakia
World Athletics Championships athletes for the Czech Republic
Medalists at the 1992 Summer Olympics
Olympic gold medalists in athletics (track and field)
World Athletics Indoor Championships winners